A Perfect Night to Go to China is a 2005 novel by David Gilmour. It won the 2005 Governor General's Award for English-language fiction.

References 

2005 Canadian novels
Governor General's Award-winning fiction books
Thomas Allen Publishers books